Joania is a genus of brachiopods belonging to the family Megathyrididae.

The species of this genus are found in Southern Europe and Northern Africa.

Species:

Joania arguta 
Joania cordata 
Joania peyrerensis 
Joania ukrainica

References

Brachiopod genera
Terebratulida